Chappell Dossett (1883–1961) was a British stage and film actor.

Selected filmography
 The King's Outcast (1915)
 Charity Ann (1915)
 Partners at Last (1916)
 Judge Not (1920)
 The Cowboy and the Countess (1926)
 Name the Woman (1928)
 The Mysterious Dr. Fu Manchu (1929)
 Madame X (1929)

References

Bibliography
 Hanke, Ken.  A Critical Guide to Horror Film Series. Routledge, 2013.

External links

1883 births
1961 deaths
English male film actors
English male silent film actors
20th-century English male actors
English male stage actors
Male actors from London
British emigrants to the United States